A suicide bomb attack took place on the Supreme Court of Afghanistan in Kabul on 11 June 2013. At least 16 people died and 40 others were injured.

Attack 
The perpetrator drove a car filled with explosives into buses which were carrying court employees including judges. The Taliban took responsibility for the attack, saying that they delivered a blow to judges who obeyed Western powers. The attack came a day after militants attacked Kabul International Airport.

Reactions 
 Afghanistan President Hamid Karzai condemned the attack, saying, "it was another terrorist act that once again shows the Taliban are serving the enemies of Islam".
 UN Secretary-General Ban Ki-moon condemned the attack, stating, "Targeted attacks against civilians are unacceptable and a serious breach of international humanitarian law".

See also 
 List of terrorist attacks in Kabul

References 

2013 murders in Afghanistan
Taliban attacks
Terrorist incidents in Kabul
Terrorist incidents in Afghanistan in 2013
Suicide car and truck bombings in Afghanistan
Supreme Court of Afghanistan
Mass murder in 2013
Mass murder in Kabul
2013 in Kabul
June 2013 events in Afghanistan